HaAh HaGadol 12 (lit. The Big Brother 12) is the Israeli version of the reality television show Big Brother. The twelfth season premiered on June 7, 2022, on Israeli broadcast channel Reshet 13.

The season was unique in several ways: for the first time in the program's history, the Big Brother house had several floors and an elevator. Two days before the start of the season, one of the housemates tested positive for COVID-19 and did not enter the house until the ninth day. On the third day, a person chosen at random was picked to join the Big Brother house, another first in the Big Brother franchise. On the fifth day,  houseguest Talia Ovadia, ex-wife of contestant Eliav Tati, joined the Big Brother house.

Housemates 
24 housemates entered the house on day one, and further participants entered on days three, five, and nine due to testing positive for COVID-19.

Nominations Table

Notes

: In the first week, Sharon and Talia enter separately from the housemate's entrance.
: In that same week, Netanel and Dian were treated as one housemate until the end of the Sixth week.
: Marina, Dian, Kazim, Sharon, and Sharin received immunity after Sharon chose them for his final 5, apart from the secret mission.
: In the second week, a new housemate named Omri entered the house, and after his entrance to the house on the opening night was postponed as a result of COVID-19 - after his late entrance he got immunity.
: Dian and Netanel are Nominated together as a result of the first secret mission.
: Ilana and Daniel chosen by the housemates go to the elevator, and one of them goes up to floor 6 and the other one to floor 7. A housemate that chooses floor 6 will get immunity, and the housemate that chooses floor 7 will stay on the eliminations list and stays on the next week's eliminations list. Daniel goes up to floor 6 and gets immunity and Ilana goes up to floor 7 and will stay on the eliminations list and at the next week's eliminations list.
: At the Bible Mission, Kazim casts Plagues on the housemates. Omri got the "Death of firstborn son" Plague, which means that Omri will be first of everything - to eat, smoke, go to sleep, and even to get nominated for elimination first. As a result, Omri is automatically on the eliminations list.
: At the Split Mission, Sharon and Dian & Netanel get immunity after Sharon and Dian got last in the "Non-favorites" Team.
: Big Brother places the housemates in a dilemma. In that week they will be Against the public or all of them will be nominated for elimination. The housemates choose the second choice and all of them will be nominated for elimination this week.
: Originally, That Entry Elimination's week list was: Ofek, Bar, Talia, Kazim, and Riwa. But after Sharon breaks the mission, the mission was canceled and That Entry Elimination's week was changed by the housemates.
: Moshe enters the house for a date with Sharin, and after that, he's back at Neve Ilan hotel. Sharin was supposed to choose whether she was to allow Moshe to stay in the house and if he will be an official housemate or not. Sharin chose to allow Moshe to stay in the house and he received immunity that week.
: Before their entry, 4 of the new housemates need to choose gifts for the housemates: estoppel, Public Elimination Setting, Automatic Elimination Setting, and immunity. Dana chose the Public Elimination Setting Gift and gave it to Riwa and Riwa was Supposed to Eliminate live in public for all the housemates. David chose the immunity Gift and gave it to Dina and Dina was Saved from Elimination. Lia chose the estoppel gift and gave it to Kazim so Kazim would not get eliminated in the next Elimination, and Liran chose the Automatic Elimination Setting and gave it to Bar, and Bar was Automatically on that week's elimination list.  
: Dian and Netanel set eliminations and got Punished by getting to the elimination list.
: After "Hitler's Scandal of Netanel and Shahaf", the elimination was postponed by a day and set to take place in the ninth week.
: In that week, Dror enters the house after recovering from COVID-19.
: Elimination was postponed to Sunday Due to Tisha B'Av.
: Kazim and Dina take Moshe to the Elimination List and Talia takes Dror to the Elimination during the fortune mission.
: Netanel and Kazim are automatically on the elimination list after a big fight between them.
: During the fortune list, one of the nominations will be saved and replaced by another housemate. The ball on the fortune roulette stops on Lia and she is saved from elimination and takes Talia to the elimination list.
: The housemates voted to eliminate in public.
: In that week, there will be triple elimination. All the housemates were eliminated except one housemate who received immunity. In the backyard, many packages of "Terminal X" are seen. One of them is named "immunity" and all of the rest of them are named "X." All of them choose one package, and Moshe opens the package and got the name "immunity" and is saved from elimination's week for the final 10. All the rest open the package in turns and got "X" and go to the elimination list.
: The housemates vote on who gets the immunity. Ilana is chosen and automatically gets to the finals.
: After a housemate eviction, the evicted will choose another housemate to get automatically put on the next week's elimination list. The rule was canceled in the ninth week.

Total Nominations Received

References

External Links 
  

2022 Israeli television seasons
12
Entertainment scandals